Silesia is a census-designated place and unincorporated community in Carbon County, Montana, United States. As of the 2010 census it had a population of 96.

Clarks Fork Yellowstone River flows to the east of town. It is about 10 miles from Laurel.

Demographics

History
The town was named after the region of Silesia in Central Europe by Julius Lehrkind, an immigrant from Silesia. Silesia's post office was established on May 18, 1900, with Charles Buzzetti as its first postmaster.

References

Census-designated places in Carbon County, Montana
Silesian-American history
Unincorporated communities in Montana
Census-designated places in Montana
Unincorporated communities in Carbon County, Montana